Arnaud Joyet (born 3 April 1974) is a French singer, musician, comedian and theatre director. He plays Stan in the series Hero Corp.

References

External links
 

1974 births
Living people
French comedians
French male television actors
French musicians
French theatre directors
21st-century French singers
21st-century French male singers